The Poznań–Szczecin railway is a Polish  rail transport line that connects Poznań with Krzyż Wielkopolski, Stargard and further to Szczecin.  The railway is part of European TEN-T route E59 from Scandinavia to Vienna, Budapest and Prague.

See also 
 Railway lines of Poland

References

External links 

Railway lines in Poland